Cornelia (Keetie) Hage, known by her married name Keetie van Oosten-Hage, (born 21 August 1949) is a Dutch former cyclist from Sint-Maartensdijk, Zeeland. She came from a family of cyclists, sister of Bella Hage, Heleen Hage and Ciska Hage, and aunt to Jan van Velzen. She was the national pursuit champion 12 times consecutively and won the national road championship nine times, eight times consecutively. She was the World Road Cycling Champion twice, first in 1968 under her maiden name of Cornelia (Keetie/Katie) Hage, then again in 1976 in her married name (shown here). She is one of the great women competitors of all time in international cycling.

On 16 September 1978, Hage set a world hour record at Munich with 43.082 km. She improved the world 5 km, 10 km and 20 km records in the same ride. She was Dutch sportswoman of the year in 1976 and 1978 and the trophy awarded each year to the Netherlands' best woman cyclist is named after her. There were few international stage races for women in her period and no women's cycling in the Olympic Games.

She retired, she said, because:

The Dutch cycling federation, the KNWU, gave her a job working with women coming up in her place. She became what the federation called its coordinator from 1985.

She considered becoming the coach or taking some other defined job within cycling. But that would have involved taking a course and passing examinations, which did not appeal, and there were reports that the KNWU did not encourage her to do so.

She taught handicrafts part-time at a college near her home in Kloetinge outside Goes, in Zeeland, and rode a bike a lot less, saying in 1990 that she missed that but not racing. She gave away all the rainbow jerseys she won as world champion. 

She rode 40 to 60 road races a year:

She never enjoyed meeting journalists. She said:

Notes and references

1949 births
Living people
Dutch female cyclists
People from Tholen
UCI Road World Champions (women)
UCI Track Cycling World Champions (women)
UCI Road World Championships cyclists for the Netherlands
Cyclists from Zeeland
Dutch track cyclists